Bartramia is a genus of mosses in the family Bartramiaceae. The genus was first formally described by Johann Hedwig in 1801. There are about 72 species, usually growing on soil, sometimes on rocks, in many habitats in many parts of the world, although tropical species are only found at high altitudes. Nine species occur in Australia but only three of these are endemic to that continent.

Description
The plants are bright green, yellowish-green or bluish-green. The stems are branched but not in whorls, with the outer layer formed of small cells and the central strand prominent. The leaves are linear, subulate or serrated and the costa is strong, percurrent or short-excurrent. The upper cells are linear or rectangular, more elongated near the leaf base and pimply near the ends of the lumen. The peristome is often absent or reduced, sometimes single and the spores are nearly spherical, kidney-shaped or warty.

Taxonomy and naming
The genus Bartramia was first formally described in 1801 by the German botanist Johann Hedwig and published in Species muscorum frondosorum. Hedwig only described two species, (B. halleriana and B. pomiformis but about 72 species are now recognised. The name Bartramia honours the pioneer American botanist John Bartram.

Species include:

Bartramia alaris  Dixon & Sainsbury
Bartramia breutelii  Müll.Hal.
Bartramia brevifolia  Brid.
Bartramia halleriana  Hedwig
Bartramia hampeana  Müll.Hal.
Bartramia ithyphylla Brid.
Bartramia mossmaniana  Müll.Hal.
Bartramia nothostricta  Catches.
Bartramia pomiformis  Hedwig
Bartramia potosica  Mont.
Bartramia pseudostricta  Catches.
Bartramia robusta  Hook.f. & Wilson
Bartramia strictifolia  Taylor 
Bartramia subsymmetrica  Cardot 
Bartramia subulata  Bruch and A.Schimp.

Distribution and habitat
Mosses in the genus Bartramia are found throughout the world but most often in temperate and mountainous areas, especially those with a humid climate. It is rarely found in arctic, alpine or arid areas and in the tropics it is usually only found at high altitudes. It often grows on shady rocks, on the northern side in the northern hemisphere, commonly near streams and waterfalls where the humidity is high.

References

External links
 Moss organs, Moss organ terminology

 
Moss genera